The 2019 Japan Women's Open was a women's tennis tournament played on outdoor hard courts. It was the eleventh edition of the Japan Women's Open, and part of the WTA International tournaments of the 2019 WTA Tour. It was held at the Regional Park Tennis Stadium in Hiroshima, Japan, from September 9 through September 15, 2019.

Point distribution

Prize money

1 Qualifiers prize money is also the Round of 32 prize money
2 Per team

Singles main-draw entrants

Seeds

 Rankings are as of August 26, 2019

Other entrants
The following players received wildcards into the singles main draw:
  Kurumi Nara 
  Risa Ozaki 
  Ayano Shimizu

The following players received entry from the qualifying draw:
  Leylah Annie Fernandez
  Zoe Hives
  Junri Namigata
  Valeria Savinykh
  Patricia Maria Țig
  Viktoriya Tomova

Withdrawals
Before the tournament
  Daria Gavrilova → replaced by  Priscilla Hon
  Barbora Krejčíková → replaced by  Nao Hibino
  Anna Karolína Schmiedlová → replaced by  Katarzyna Kawa

Retirements
During the tournament
  Zarina Diyas (low back injury)

Doubles main-draw entrants

Seeds

1 Rankings are as of August 26, 2019

Other entrants
The following pairs received wildcards into the doubles main draw:
  Erina Hayashi /  Moyuka Uchijima  
  Kyōka Okamura /  Ayano Shimizu

Retirements
  Greet Minnen (right shoulder injury)

Champions

Singles

  Nao Hibino def.  Misaki Doi, 6–3, 6–2

Doubles

  Misaki Doi /  Nao Hibino def.  Christina McHale /  Valeria Savinykh, 3–6, 6–4, [10–4]

References

External links

Japan Women's Open
Japan Women's Open
Japan Women's Open
Japan Women's Open
2019 in Japanese tennis